"The Cat with Ten Lives" is the third episode aired of the first series of UFO - a 1970 British television science fiction series about an alien invasion of Earth. David Tomblin wrote the screenplay and directed the episode. The episode was filmed between 22 May and 3 June 3, 1970  and aired on the ATV Midlands network on 30 September 1970. Though shown as the third episode, it was actually the nineteenth to have been filmed.

The series was created by Gerry Anderson and Sylvia Anderson with Reg Hill, and produced by the Andersons and Lew Grade's Century 21 Productions for Grade's ITC Entertainment company.

Story
Moonbase interceptor pilot James Regan is on 48 hours leave from the Moon. He and his wife are invited by an older couple, the Thompsons, who have mysteriously been given an unusual psychic board game. Whilst the two couples are playing the game, Regan starts to have strange reactions and faints. Later, as Regan and his wife are driving down a country road they stop their car to avoid a Siamese cat. They are then abducted by aliens who take them to their UFO, where he has another experience similar to the one he had at the Thompson home. Regan awakes back in his car with the cat but his wife missing, abducted by the aliens. Regan explains his story at SHADO Control but Straker sends him back to the moon. Meanwhile the cat now has free rein inside Control.

SHADO's resident doctor - Douglas Jackson - has performed an autopsy on an alien body and found it to be entirely human, not - as previously believed - an alien species that harvests human organs to extend its lifespan. He surmises that the aliens may be able to control human brains.

When piloting his SHADO Interceptor escorting the Venus probe, Regan fails to destroy a UFO that leaves Earth carrying his wife. He is recalled to Earth for an assessment. Still controlled by the cat, Regan attacks Col. Paul Foster and returns to the moon, where he puts his interceptor on a crash course with Moonbase. Straker determines that the cat is controlling Regan and has it eliminated. No longer under alien control, Regan sacrifices himself by just missing Moonbase but is unable to avoid impacting on the lunar surface.

Cast

Starring
 Ed Bishop — Commander Edward "Ed" Straker, Commander-in-chief of SHADO
 Michael Billington — Col. Paul Foster
 Dolores Mantez — Lt. Nina Barry, Moonbase operative
 Ayshea — Lt. Ayshea Johnson
 Vladek Sheybal — Dr. Douglas Jackson

Guest stars
 Alexis Kanner — Lt. Jim Regan
 Lois Maxwell — Miss Holland	
 Steven Berkoff — Captain Steve Minto

Featuring
 Geraldine Moffatt — Jean Regan
 Wanda Ventham - Col. Virginia Lake
 Colin Gordon — Albert Thompson	
 Eleanor Summerfield — Muriel Thompson	
 Windsor Davies — Morgan	
 Al Mancini — Lt. Andy Conroy

Production notes
Pinewood Studios, Buckinghamshire and Neptune House at ATV Elstree Studios, Borehamwood.

References

External links
 Screenplay for the episode

1970 British television episodes
UFO (TV series) episodes